Athous is a genus of click beetles belonging to the family Elateridae.

Species

 Athous abdurachmanovi Dolin in Dolin & Penev, 2004
 Athous acanthus (Say, 1839)
 Athous acutangulus Fairmaire, 1866
 Athous agriotoides Fall, 1907
 Athous albanicus Csiki, 1940
 Athous alnicola Gistel, 1857
 Athous alpestris Orlov, 1994
 Athous alticola Platia, 2006
 Athous anatolicus Platia, 1989
 Athous angulifrons Reitter, 1905
 Athous apfelbecki Reitter, 1905
 Athous appalachius Van Dyke, 1932
 Athous arizonicus Van Dyke, 1932
 Athous artvinensis Platia, Yildirim & Kesdek, 2007
 Athous astrabadensis Faust, 1877
 Athous asturiensis Platia, 2006
 Athous aterrimus Fall, 1910
 Athous audisioi Guglielmi & Platia, 1985
 Athous austriacus Desbrochers des Loges, 1873
 Athous axillaris Horn, 1871
 Athous azoricus Platia & Gudenzi, 2002
 Athous balcanicus Reitter, 1905
 Athous barriesi Platia & Gudenzi, 1996
 Athous barthei Leseigneur, 1958
 Athous bedeli Fleutiaux, 1928
 Athous belloi Guglielmi & Platia, 1985
 Athous benedikti Platia, 2003
 Athous bicolor (Goeze, 1777)
 Athous binaghii Platia, 1984
 Athous birmanicus Fleutiaux, 1942
 Athous bolivari Reitter, 1904
 Athous bolognai Guglielmi & Platia, 1985
 Athous brachati Zeising & Brunne, 2005
 Athous brevicornis Desbrochers des Loges, 1871
 Athous brevipennis Schwarz, 1897
 Athous brevis Fleutiaus, 1928
 Athous brightwelli (Kirby, 1837)
 Athous bulgaricus Platia, 2001
 Athous cachecticus Candèze, 1860
 Athous campyloides Newman, 1833
 Athous cantabricus Schaufuss, 1862
 Athous canus Dufour, 1843
 Athous carpathicus Reitter, 1905
 Athous carpathophilus Reitter, 1905
 Athous catalonicus Platia, 2006
 Athous cavazzutii Platia, 2003
 Athous caviformis Reitter, 1905
 Athous cavifrons L. Redtenbacher, 1858
 Athous cavulus Reitter, 1905
 Athous cavus (Germar, 1817)
 Athous cervicolor Heyden, 1880
 Athous chamboveti Mulsant & Godart, 1868
 Athous chapaensis Fleutiaux, 1928
 Athous cingulatus L. Miller, 1881
 Athous circassicus Reitter, 1888
 Athous circassiensis Reitter, 1905
 Athous circumductus (Ménétriés, 1832)
 Athous codinai Platia, 2006
 Athous conradi Platia, 2006
 Athous coomani Fleutiaux, 1928
 Athous coquerelli Reitter, 1908
 Athous corcyreus Reitter, 1905
 Athous corsicus Reiche, 1861
 Athous crassicornis Candèze, 1860
 Athous cribratus LeConte, 1876
 Athous croaticus Platia & Gudenzi, 2002
 Athous csikii Platia, 2001
 Athous cucullatus (Say, 1825)
 Athous curtulus Desbrochers des Loges, 1873
 Athous curtus Dolin in Dolin & Penev, 2004
 Athous daccordii Guglielmi & Platia, 1985
 Athous daghestanicus Reitter, 1890
 Athous dalmatinus Platia, 2005
 Athous dasycerus Buysson, 1890
 Athous debilis Reiche, 1869
 Athous dejeanii (Laporte, 1840)
 Athous delmastroi Platia & Gudenzi, 1998
 Athous demangei Fleutiaux, 1918
 Athous demirsoyi Platia, Kabalak & Sert, 2007
 Athous densatus Reitter, 1905
 Athous desbrochersi Platia, 2006
 Athous difficilis (Dufour, 1843)
 Athous dilaticornis Reitter, 1905
 Athous dimidiatus Gistel, 1857
 Athous diplogrammus Orlov, 1994
 Athous discrepans Reitter, 1908
 Athous distinctithorax Desbrochers des Loges, 1873
 Athous divaricatus Platia, 2006
 Athous dorgaliensis Buysson, 1912
 Athous durazzoi Platia, 1985
 Athous dusaneki Platia, 2003
 Athous ebeninus Fleutiaux, 1918
 Athous eckerleini Platia & Gudenzi, 2000
 Athous edirnensis Platia & Gudenzi, 2000
 Athous emaciatus Candèze, 1860
 Athous epirus Stierlin, 1875
 Athous equestris (LeConte, 1853)
 Athous escolai Platia, 2006
 Athous espanoli Platia, 2006
 Athous espinamensis Platia, 2006
 Athous essigi Van Dyke, 1932
 Athous euxinus Buysson, 1912
 Athous excavatus (Motschulsky, 1859)
 Athous farallonicus Van Dyke, 1951
 Athous fausti Reitter, 1890
 Athous filicornis (Dufour, 1851)
 Athous flavipennis Candèze, 1860
 Athous fossularis (LeConte, 1853)
 Athous fragariae Platia & Kovanci, 2005
 Athous francoisi Fleutiaux, 1928
 Athous freudei Platia, 1989
 Athous frigidus Mulsant & Guillebeau, 1855
 Athous frontalis Platia & Schimmel, 1991
 Athous fueguensis Golbach & Aranda, 1991
 Athous fuentei Platia, 2006
 Athous funestus Champion, 1896
 Athous gagliardii Platia, 1988
 Athous galiberti Buysson, 1918
 Athous gallicus Platia & Gudenzi, 2000
 Athous ganglbaueri Schwarz, 1897
 Athous gerezianus Reitter, 1905
 Athous gianassoi Platia & Gudenzi, 1996
 Athous giustoi Platia, 2006
 Athous gobanzi Reitter, 1905
 Athous godarti Mulsant & Guillebeau, 1853
 Athous gonzalesi Platia, 2006
 Athous goriciensis Reitter, 1905
 Athous gottwaldi Lohse, 1978
 Athous gracacensis Platia, 2005
 Athous graecus Platia, 1989
 Athous guadalupensis Platia, 2006
 Athous gudenzii Guglielmi & Platia, 1985
 Athous haemorrhoidalis (Fabricius, 1801)
 Athous hajeki Platia & Gudenzi, 2005
 Athous harmodius Reitter, 1905
 Athous herbigradus Mulsant & Guillebeau, 1855
 Athous hetzeli Platia, 2004
 Athous hilfi Reitter, 1912
 Athous holtzi Reitter, 1905
 Athous humeralis (Fischer von Waldheim, 1824)
 Athous iablokoffi Leseigneur, 1972
 Athous ibericus Platia, 2006
 Athous imitans Fall, 1910
 Athous incognitus Platia, 1988
 Athous ineptus Candèze, 1860
 Athous insularis Desbrochers des Loges, 1869
 Athous iranicus Platia, 2004
 Athous iristonicus Dolin, 1971
 Athous jejunus Kiesenwetter, 1858
 Athous judicariensis Schwarz, 1900
 Athous kasovskyi Platia & Gudenzi, 2007
 Athous kaszabi Dolin, 1986
 Athous kerkyranus Reitter, 1905
 Athous kobachidzei Dolin & Chantladze, 1982
 Athous korabicus Csiki, 1940
 Athous kovancii Platia, 2003
 Athous kruegeri Reitter, 1905
 Athous kubani Schimmel, 1998
 Athous laevistriatus (Dufour, 1851)
 Athous lambeleti Leseigneur, 2004
 Athous lassallei Platia & Gudenzi, 1996
 Athous latior Orlov, 1994
 Athous lecontei (Candèze, 1889)
 Athous leonhardi Reitter, 1905
 Athous lepontinus Schwarz, 1900
 Athous leprieuri Desbrochers des Loges, 1870
 Athous leseigneuri Platia, 2006
 Athous lgockii Dolin, 1983
 Athous limbatus LeConte, 1866
 Athous limoniiformis Candèze, 1865
 Athous lomnickii Reitter, 1905
 Athous longicornis Candèze, 1865
 Athous luigionii Platia, 1988
 Athous lusitanus Platia, 2006
 Athous magnanii Guglielmi & Platia, 1985
 Athous malaisei Fleutiaux, 1942
 Athous malkinorum Platia, 2006
 Athous malmusii Platia & Gudenzi, 2000
 Athous mandibularis (Dufour, 1843)
 Athous margheritae Guglielmi & Platia, 1985
 Athous marginicollis Reitter, 1890
 Athous massiei Fleutiaux, 1928
 Athous melanoderes Mulsant & Guillebeau, 1855
 Athous melonii Platia, 1984
 Athous mendesi Giuseppe & Serrano, 2002
 Athous mertliki Platia & Gudenzi, 2002
 Athous meuseli Reitter, 1905
 Athous mingrelicus Reitter, 1890
 Athous minutus Fleutiaux, 1928
 Athous mokrzeckii Lomnicki, 1923
 Athous mollis Reitter, 1889
 Athous monguzzii Platia & Gudenzi, 2007
 Athous monilicornis Schwarz, 1897
 Athous nadari Buysson, 1904
 Athous nadoraz Mertlik & Dusanek, 2006
 Athous naseri J. Müller, 1916
 Athous neacanthus Becker, 1974
 Athous nigropilis Motschulsky, 1859
 Athous nigror Platia, 2006
 Athous nodieri Fleutiaux, 1918
 Athous novaki Penecke, 1907
 Athous obsoletus (Illiger, 1807)
 Athous olbiensis Mulsant & Guillebeau, 1856
 Athous olcesei Buysson, 1905
 Athous olgae Iablokov-Khnzorian, 1961
 Athous opacus Fleutiaux, 1934
 Athous opilinus Candèze, 1860
 Athous ornatipennis (LeConte, 1863)
 Athous oromii Platia & Gudenzi, 2005
 Athous orvus Becker, 1974
 Athous osellai Guglielmi & Platia, 1985
 Athous pacei Guglielmi & Platia, 1985
 Athous paflagonensis Platia & Gudenzi, 1998
 Athous paganettii Platia, 2006
 Athous pallidus Platia & Gudenzi, 2002
 Athous panellai Platia & Schimmel, 1991
 Athous paradisus Knull, 1934
 Athous parallelopipedus Brullé, 1832
 Athous patoni Dolin in Dolin & Penev, 2004
 Athous pedemontanus Platia, 1988
 Athous penevi Platia, 2001
 Athous perezarcasi Platia, 2006
 Athous perroti Fleutiaux, 1940
 Athous pfefferi Roubal, 1932
 Athous phylander Tottenham, 1948
 Athous picipennis Reitter, 1905
 Athous plagipennis Reitter, 1905
 Athous polygenus (Fall, 1910)
 Athous pomboi Platia & Borges, 2003
 Athous ponticus Platia & Gudenzi, 2007
 Athous posticus (Melsheimer, 1844)
 Athous productus (Randall, 1838)
 Athous propinquus Buysson, 1890
 Athous protoracicus Platia & Schimmel, 1991
 Athous prouzai Platia, 2005
 Athous proximus Hampe, 1864
 Athous putativus Platia, 2006
 Athous putschkovi Dolin & Penev, 2004
 Athous pyrenaeus Candèze, 1865
 Athous reflexicollis Dolin & Penev, 2004
 Athous reitteri Platia, 2006
 Athous reynosae C. N. F. Brisout de Barneville, 1866
 Athous roralis Gistel, 1857
 Athous rosinae Reitter, 1899
 Athous ruffoi Guglielmi & Platia, 1985
 Athous rufifrons (Randall, 1838)
 Athous rufipennis Van Dyke, 1932
 Athous rufithorax Miwa, 1930
 Athous rufotestaceous Fall, 1907
 Athous ruteri Chassain, 1985
 Athous sabatinellii Guglielmi & Platia, 1985
 Athous sacheri Kiesenwetter, 1858
 Athous samai Guglielmi & Platia, 1985
 Athous sameki Platia, 2003
 Athous sanguinicollis Frivaldsky, 1892
 Athous scapularis (Say, 1839)
 Athous scissus LeConte, 1857
 Athous senaci Buysson, 1890
 Athous serbicus Reitter, 1905
 Athous serranoi Platia, 2006
 Athous settei Guglielmi & Platia, 1985
 Athous shirozui Ôhira, 1966
 Athous silicensis Laibner, 1975
 Athous singularis Reitter, 1905
 Athous sinuatocollis Desbrochers des Loges, 1869
 Athous siteki Platia, 2006
 Athous snizeki Platia, 2004
 Athous sosybius Reitter, 1905
 Athous spalatrensis Reitter, 1894
 Athous stoimenovae Platia, 2001
 Athous striatus Fleutiaux, 1940
 Athous strictus (Fischer von Waldheim, 1824)
 Athous subfuscus (Müller, 1767)
 Athous subtruncatoides Platia, 2006
 Athous subtruncatus Mulsant & Guillebeau, 1856
 Athous subvirgatus Daniel, 1904
 Athous svihlai Platia & Gudenzi, 1998
 Athous szombathyi Schenkling, 1927
 Athous talamellii Platia & Gudenzi, 1998
 Athous tattakensis (Miwa, 1928)
 Athous tattakensis Miwa, 1928
 Athous tauricola Reitter, 1905
 Athous tauricus Candèze, 1860
 Athous tekkirazicus Platia, 2003
 Athous temperatus Miwa, 1930
 Athous tomentosus Mulsant & Guillebeau, 1855
 Athous transylvanicus Platia, 2001
 Athous tribertii Guglielmi & Platia, 1985
 Athous tschukini Reitter, 1910
 Athous turcicus Reitter, 1905
 Athous uncicollis Perris, 1864
 Athous utschderensis Reitter, 1890
 Athous vanmeeri Chassain, 2007
 Athous vasconicus Platia, 2006
 Athous vavrai Platia, 2006
 Athous vicinus Desbrochers des Loges, 1873
 Athous villardi Carret, 1904
 Athous villiger Mulsant & Guillebeau, 1855
 Athous villosulus Desbrochers des Loges, 1875
 Athous vitalisi Fleutiaux, 1918
 Athous vittatoides Reitter, 1905
 Athous vittatus (Fabricius, 1792)
 Athous vittiger LeConte, 1853
 Athous vivesi Platia & Gudenzi, 2005
 Athous vomeroi Platia, 1988
 Athous warchalowskii Platia & Tarnawski, 1998
 Athous weigeli Schimmel, 1998
 Athous wewalkai Platia, 1989
 Athous zanettii Guglielmi & Platia, 1985
 Athous zappiorum Platia, 1985
 Athous zbuzeki Platia & Gudenzi, 2007
 Athous zebei Bach, 1852
 Athous ziegleri Zeising & Brunne, 2005

References 

 Biolib

Elateridae genera
Dendrometrinae
Beetles described in 1829
Taxa named by Johann Friedrich von Eschscholtz